New Mexico School for the Arts is a charter high school in the Santa Fe Railyard in Santa Fe, New Mexico.

History
The New Mexico Legislature in 2008 passed a bill that allowed for the school to be created. The school opened in 2010 in a former Catholic elementary school.

It moved into its current facility in 2019. During the COVID-19 pandemic in New Mexico students used video recordings and altered dance routines to cope with new conditions.

Operations
 it is classified as a charter school, with the state chartering it, and has a six-person school board. That year the school asked the state government to reclassify it as a "special statewide residential public school" so it would no longer be a charter school, allowing it to have its own superintendent and a nine-person school board.

Admissions
The school accepts students based on auditions, differing from lotteries used by most charter schools.

Campus
The current campus previously was the Sanbusco Market Center. Because classes were held virtually during the COVID-19 pandemic, the cafeteria's construction work began in 2020. Klinger Constructors of Albuquerque is the construction company. The Sanbusco Market Center was heavily renovated and new additions were constructed to expand the campus. Luchini Trujillo Structural Engineers was the Structural Engineer of record. Prior to 2020 the former paseo was an impromptu dining room.

Dormitory

Transportation
Dormitory residents are expected to commute to school through Albuquerque's public transportation system.

Curriculum
By 2020 the school was developing its creative writing program.

References

External links
 New Mexico School for the Arts

Charter schools in New Mexico
Charter high schools in the United States
Public high schools in New Mexico
2010 establishments in New Mexico
Educational institutions established in 2010
Public boarding schools in the United States
Boarding schools in New Mexico